Joonas Vaino (born 22 April 1992) is an Estonian professional basketball player. He is currently playing for Finnish club Namika Lahti at the power forward position.

Club career

Joonas Vaino came through youth ranks to play first-tier basketball for BC Rakvere Tarvas and made his debut in KML when he was 16 years old. In his first year, he spent most of the time on the bench, because his season was marred with injuries. The following season he joined Korisliiga team LrNMKY though, where he stayed for a season. He rejoined the hometown team which had reached the finals during his Finnish year, and played there for two seasons. Since 2012, he has been playing with Namika Lahti.

International career

Vaino has been a member of many youth national teams with his native Estonia. With U20 team, they managed to get promotion to the FIBA Europe Under-20 Championship A division, defeating Belgium U20 on their way to the final, but lost to Georgian team.

Honours
Korvpalli Meistriliiga
3rd place: 2011-12
Estonian Basketball Cup
Runner-up: 2010–11
3rd place: 2011-12
BBL Challenge Cup
Runner-up: 2011-12

External links
 Profile at basket.ee
 Profile at bbl.net
 Profile at bctarvas.ee

References

1992 births
Living people
Estonian men's basketball players
Korvpalli Meistriliiga players
Namika Lahti players
Power forwards (basketball)